The Global Environment Centre (GEC) is a non-profit, non-governmental organization which was established in 1998 to address key environmental issues of global importance such as climate change, biodiversity and water resources. GEC is based in Malaysia but supports activities worldwide. It has field programmes in more than 10 countries and coordinates a number of regional and global networks.

The Organisation's mission is "to support the protection of the environment and sustainable use of natural resources to meet local, regional and global needs through strategic partnerships with communities and like-minded organisations".

The Organisation organizes its activities based on four core programmes:
 Forest and Biodiversity Programme
 Peatland Programme
 River Care Programme
 Outreach and Partnership Programme

References

External links 
http://www.gec.org.my/index.cfm?&menuid=61
http://www.gefngo.org/index.cfm?&menuid=61 
http://www.gec.org.my/index.cfm?&menuid=10
http://www.ramsar.org/cda/en/ramsar-news-archives-2001-southeast-asia-peat/main/ramsar/1-26-45-88%5E17821_4000_0__

Environmental organisations based in Malaysia